The North Anatolian Fault (NAF) is an active right-lateral strike-slip fault in northern Anatolia, and is the transform boundary between the Eurasian Plate and the Anatolian Plate.  The fault extends westward from a junction with the East Anatolian Fault at the Karliova Triple Junction in eastern Turkey, across northern Turkey and into the Aegean Sea for a length of 1200−1500 kilometers.   It runs about 20 km south of Istanbul.
The North Anatolian Fault is similar in many ways to the San Andreas Fault in California. Both are continental transforms with similar lengths and slip rates. The Sea of Marmara near Istanbul is an extensional basin similar to the Salton Trough in California, where a releasing bend in the strike-slip system creates a pull-apart basin.

Significant earthquakes

Since the disastrous 1939 Erzincan earthquake, there have been seven earthquakes measuring over 7.0 in magnitude, each happening at a point progressively further west. Seismologists studying this pattern believe that each earthquake may trigger the next. By analyzing the stresses along the fault caused by each large earthquake, they were able to predict the shock that hit the town of İzmit with devastating effect in August 1999. It is thought that the chain is not complete, and that an earthquake will soon strike further west along the fault – perhaps near the heavily populated city of Istanbul.

Notes

External links
 Latest seismicity In Turkey

Seismic faults of Turkey
Strike-slip faults
Supershear earthquakes
Strike-slip earthquakes